Rhaatee is a 2015 Indian Kannada romantic thriller film written and directed by A. P. Arjun, in his third directorial venture after the successful films like Ambari and Addhuri. The film also marks the second production of music director V. Harikrishna under his home banner "Harmonium Reeds". The film stars Dhananjay and Shruthi Hariharan in the lead roles. The film has the musical score and soundtrack composed by V. Harikrishna. The film, launched officially on 3 March 2013 underwent several delays and took a long shoot time and finally released theatrically on 20 March 2015.

Plot 
Raja and Rani are young lovers from Keregodu village in Mandya, They land in Bengaluru for their wedding shopping, Rani, who is a big fan of Darshan, wants to see his blockbuster movie Sangolli Rayanna in Mahadeshwara theatre. In the theatre, Rani goes to the washroom but doesn’t return, Raja searches for her everywhere on the outskirts of Bangalore. When Rani is found, Raja is shocked to learn that one of Rani's kidneys has been removed by illegal organ traders. He takes them on and kills the kingpin Shankar and escapes to Muthathi forest where there are informed by their auto driver friend 24/7 Jaganna. Shankar’s brother Seena sets out to search for them, but to no avail. They escape from the forest again after some goons attack Rani. They reach Mahadeshwara theatre where Seena is informed of their location through an auto driver where a combat ensues which results in Raja and Rani brutally killed by the Seena. Jaganna, who was doing wedding shopping reaches the theatre, only to find them dead and gets devastated.

Cast
 Dhananjay as Raja
 Shruthi Hariharan as Rani
 Bullet Prakash as Jaganna
 Suchendra Prasad as Inspector
 Mohan Juneja as Constable Shivappa
 Raghav Uday as Seena, Shankar's brother

Soundtrack

Music composer V. Harikrishna was roped in to score for both score and soundtrack consisting of 6 tracks. Actor Sudeepa recorded one song for the film in Chennai. Lyrics for the tracks were penned by A. P. Arjun and Yogaraj Bhat.

References

External links
 
 
 A Good Product Consumes Time, Says A P Arjun

2015 films
2010s Kannada-language films
2015 romance films
Indian romance films
Films shot in India